The Echigo mole (Mogera etigo) is an endangered species of mammal in the family Talpidae. It is endemic to Japan, being found only on the Echigo plain, Niigata prefecture.

References

Endemic mammals of Japan
Mogera
Taxonomy articles created by Polbot
Mammals described in 1991